Rathauspassagen is a shopping centre in Berlin, Germany.

See also
 List of shopping malls in Germany

References

External links
 

Buildings and structures in Berlin
Economy of Berlin
Shopping malls in Berlin